Hegra is a former municipality in the old Nord-Trøndelag county, Norway.  The  municipality existed from 1874 until its dissolution in 1962.  The municipality was located in the Stjørdalen valley.  It encompassed the eastern two-thirds of the what is now the municipality of Stjørdal in Trøndelag county. The administrative centre was the village of Hegra where the Hegra Church is located.

History
The municipality of Hegra was established on 1 January 1874 when the old municipality of Øvre Stjørdal was divided into Meråker (population: 1,861) in the east and Hegra (population: 3,409) in the west.  During the 1960s, there were many municipal mergers across Norway due to the work of the Schei Committee. On 1 January 1962, the neighboring municipalities of Hegra (population: 2,704), Lånke (population: 1,967), Skatval (population: 1,944), and Stjørdal (population: 6,204) were all merged to form a new, larger municipality of Stjørdal.

Name
The municipality (originally the parish) is named after the old Hegre farm since the first Hegra Church was built there. The name was originally a compound of two words. The first element is named after the local river . The river name is based on the word  which means "heron". Thus the name means something like "heron meadow". Historically, the name was spelled Hegre and in the 20th century, the spelling was changed to Hegra.

Government
While it existed, this municipality was responsible for primary education (through 10th grade), outpatient health services, senior citizen services, unemployment, social services, zoning, economic development, and municipal roads. During its existence, this municipality was governed by a municipal council of elected representatives, which in turn elected a mayor.

Municipal council
The municipal council  of Hegra was made up of 21 representatives that were elected to four year terms.  The party breakdown of the final municipal council was as follows:

Mayors
The mayors of Hegra:

 1874–1889: Olav Torsteinsen Bjørgum (V)
 1890–1893: Mikal Setsaas (V)
 1894–1897: John Halvorsen Øverkil (V)
 1898-1898: Gunerius Pedersen Hofstad (V)
 1899–1910: Ole Gundersen (H)
 1911–1922: John Lerfald (Bp/V)
 1923–1937: Torstein Mørseth (V)
 1938–1941: Johan Peter Trøite (V)
 1941-1941: Gunnar Børset (Bp)
 1941–1944: Lars O. Setran (NS)
 1944–1945: Anders Ingstad (NS)
 1945-1945: Johan Peter Trøite (V)
 1946–1947: Ole J. Hofstad (Bp)
 1948–1951: Magne Bremseth (Ap)
 1952–1955: Lars Bidtnes (V)
 1956–1957: Johan Fornes (Bp)
 1958–1959: Karl Kringen (Ap)
 1960–1961: Jon Leirfall (Sp)

See also
List of former municipalities of Norway

References

Stjørdal
Former municipalities of Norway
1874 establishments in Norway
1962 disestablishments in Norway